Puerto Carabuco Municipality is the third municipal section of the Eliodoro Camacho Province in the  La Paz Department, Bolivia. Its seat is Puerto Carabuco.

Division 
The municipality is subdivided into four cantons:
 Ambana Canton - 7,526 inhabitants (2001) 
 Puerto Carabuco Canton - 2,202 inhabitants (2001)   
 Chaguaya Canton - 5,278 inhabitants (2001) 
 San Miguel de Yaricoa Canton - 1,493 inhabitants (2001)

References 
 www.ine.gov.bo / census 2001: Puerto Carabuco Municipality

External links 
 Puerto Carabuco: population data and map

Municipalities of La Paz Department (Bolivia)